The Dismemberment Plan Is Terrified is the second studio album by American indie rock band The Dismemberment Plan. It was released on March 17, 1997 on DeSoto Records. Musically, the album is "less violent and less extravagant" than its predecessor, !. The album received positive reviews from critics, and got the band to sign with major record label Interscope.

Composition
Musically, the album can be described as a bridge between hardcore and noise rock. The track "That's When the Party Started" has a synthpop feel, while the fourth track on the album, "Academy Award", is featured as a remix by Cex on the band's final album A People's History of the Dismemberment Plan. It is the only song from The Dismemberment Plan Is Terrified to be remixed for it. "The Ice of Boston" was later released on an extended play of the same name on October 16, 1998, during their brief stint with Interscope Records. The song is spoken-word and contains references to songwriter Jonathan Richman and singer-songwriter Gladys Knight's song "Midnight Train to Georgia". Dismemberment Plan lead singer Travis Morrison described the album as "very confrontational", saying "it's the least melodic record we have, it's the most dedicated to hip-hop record we have".

Reception

The Dismemberment Plan Is Terrified received positive reviews from music critics. Brian Raftery of AllMusic commented that the album was not as good as The Dismemberment Plan's debut album, !, but nevertheless named "That's When the Party Started", "The Ice of Boston", and "Do the Standing Still" as standout tracks of the album. In Metro, Nicky Baxter praised the album for being "wonderfully varied", finding that "no two tracks sound alike" and ultimately describing it as "a mess that's hard to resist."

American music critic Robert Christgau called the album "surprisingly thoughtful for post-hardcore", stating that it sounds "sort of the way Primus might if Primus enjoyed a normal sex life." And from the way the guitars and such come crashing down to break up a good party and set off a better one." Joe Garden of The A.V. Club published a positive review, saying "Odds are good that you'll find something you like right off the bat, and the rest will grow on you before you realize it." Tiny Mix Tapes wrote that with The Dismemberment Plan Is Terrified, the band "completely annihilates the term sophomore slump". Despite The Dismemberment Plan Is Terrified not being "radio friendly", it led to major record label Interscope Records signing the band due to its strength.

Track listing

Personnel
The following people were involved in the making of The Dismemberment Plan Is Terrified:
The Dismemberment Plan
Eric Axelson – bass
Jason Caddell – guitar
Joe Easley – drums
Travis Morrison – vocals, guitar
Production
Chad Clark and Don Zientara – recording

References

1997 albums
The Dismemberment Plan albums
DeSoto Records albums